AppSheet is an application that provides a no-code development platform for application software, which allows users to create mobile, tablet, and web applications using data sources like Google Drive, DropBox, Office 365, and other cloud-based spreadsheet and database platforms. The platform can be utilized for a broad set of business use cases including project management, customer relationship management, field inspections, and personalized reporting.

AppSheet was acquired by Google in January 2020.

Platform
The AppSheet platform allows users to create mobile apps from cloud-based spreadsheets and databases. Apps can also be created directly as an add-on from spreadsheet platforms like Google Sheets. The platform is available from both a self-service model and a corporate licensing model for larger organizations with more governance, data analytics, and performance options. Compared to low-code development platforms which allow developers to develop with faster iteration cycles, AppSheet is a no-code platform which allows business users familiar with basic spreadsheet and database operations to build apps.

AppSheet compatible data sources include:
 Google Sheets
 Google Forms
 Microsoft Excel on Office 365
 Microsoft Excel on Dropbox
 Microsoft Excel on Box (company)
 Smartsheet
 Salesforce
 DreamFactory
 Microsoft SQL Server
 MySQL
 PostgreSQL
 Amazon DynamoDB

Features

Data Capture 
AppSheet apps capture data in the form of images, signatures, geolocation, barcodes, and NFC. Data is automatically synced to the cloud-based, or users can opt to manually sync the data at any time. Common uses for data capture include field or equipment inspections, safety inspections, reporting, and inventory management.

Data Collaboration 
Synced, shared data allows users to collaborate across mobile or desktop devices. Workflow rules can also be used to trigger notifications or work-based assignments where appropriate. Offline access is also possible as data storage is localized to the device and synced upon internet connectivity returns.

Data Display 
AppSheet data can be displayed in graphical and interactive formats. Common data views include tables, forms, maps, charts, calendars, and dashboards. Each app can hold multiple views consisting of data from various sources.

Declarative Programming Model 
AppSheet's platform allows users to declare the logic of the app's activity in order to customize the app's user experience rather than use traditional code. This level of abstraction essentially trades a granular level of customization that would be available through hard code for increased efficiency, scalability, and security that would be available through a declarative model.

Security
Data is stored on a user's device and the user's existing cloud-based storage system. When users sync their app, changes they make are sent to the AppSheet web service over an encrypted protocol (HTTPS). AppSheet then applies the changes to the backend spreadsheet (on Google Drive, Dropbox, etc.). The latest version of the spreadsheet or database is read (from Google Drive, Dropbox, etc.) and sent back to the mobile app.

AppSheet's platform is also verified as SOC2 compliant.

History
AppSheet was originally founded by Praveen Seshadri in March 2014 after several months of developing the product at his home in Seattle, Washington.

In 2015, AppSheet received seed funding from New Enterprise Associates.

In 2018, AppSheet was recognized by TiE as a Tie50 award recipient recognizing innovative tech startups.

In 2018, AppSheet launched SPEC, a natural-language programming tool allowing non-coders to build apps by asking users in plain English what they want to build.

In 2018 and 2019, AppSheet was named a leader by Forrester Research for mobile low-code platforms for business developers.

On January 14, 2020, AppSheet announced they had been acquired by Google and would be joining the Google Cloud team.

References

External links 
 

Software companies established in 2014
2014 establishments in Washington (state)
Software development
Software companies based in Washington (state)
2020 mergers and acquisitions
Google acquisitions
Google Cloud
Defunct software companies of the United States
Web applications
Cloud applications